is a junction passenger railway station in the city of Matsudo, Chiba, Japan, operated by the East Japan Railway Company (JR East) and the private Keisei Electric Railway and third sector Hokusō Railway.

Lines
It is also a stop on the Keisei Narita Sky Access linking downtown Tokyo with Narita Airport.
 
The station is located 64.0 kilometers from Fuchūhommachi Station on the Musashino Line, and 7.5 kilometers from Keisei-Takasago Station on the Hokusō and Keisei lines.

Station layout

Hokusō and Keisei

The Hokusō station consists of two elevated island platforms serving four tracks, with the station building located underneath.

Hokusō and Narita Sky Access Line platforms

JR East

The JR East station consists of two opposed side platforms serving two tracks.

JR East platforms

History
The station opened on the Hokusō Line on 31 March 1991.

The JR East station opened on 14 March 1998.

Passenger statistics
In fiscal 2019, the JR East station was used by an average of 20,839 passengers daily (boarding passengers only). The Keisei portion of the station was used by 4,537 daily in FY 2019, and the Hokuso Railway portion of the station was used by 19,082 passengers in FY2018.

Surrounding area
 Yahashira Cemetery
 Chiba Matsudo Minami High School
 Matsudo High School

See also
 List of railway stations in Japan

References

External links

 JR East station information 
 Hokuso Railway station information 

Stations of East Japan Railway Company
Railway stations in Chiba Prefecture
Railway stations in Japan opened in 1991
Musashino Line
Hokusō Line
Matsudo